Hadleigh railway station was a station in Hadleigh, Suffolk, the terminus of the Hadleigh Railway, a short branch line from Bentley Junction. The line opened in 1847. The original intermediate stations were at Bentley Church, Capel and Raydon Wood.

The terminus had goods sidings on both the south-western and north-eastern sides, the latter serving malt houses and which was also used as a running round loop. There was also a small engine shed.

The station building was very ornate, if somewhat dwarfed by the adjacent malt houses, with attractive coupled chimneys and unusual windows with the frame and arch of stone.

The decline in passenger numbers using the branch can be seen in the patronage figures, which were 14,447 in 1923 compared to 5,086 just five years later. The line closed to passenger traffic in 1932, although freight services lingered on until 1965.

A proposal to extend services by building a light railway between Hadleigh and Long Melford was reported in the Haverhill Echo on 10 March 1900, but that was not done.

The station building still stands and is in use as a private residence, with newer dwellings around it. The route to Raydon Wood is accessible as the Hadleigh Railway Walk.

References

External links
 Hadleigh station on navigable 1946 O. S. map
 The Story of Hadleigh's railway

Disused railway stations in Suffolk
Former Great Eastern Railway stations
Railway stations in Great Britain opened in 1847
Railway stations in Great Britain closed in 1932
1847 establishments in England
Hadleigh, Suffolk